Peter Durrett (1823) (also appeared in records as Peter Duerrett) was a Baptist preacher and slave, who with his wife founded the First African Baptist Church of Lexington, Kentucky by 1790. By his death, the congregation totaled nearly 300 persons. It is the first black congregation west of the Allegheny Mountains, the first black Baptist congregation in Kentucky, and the third oldest black congregation in the United States. Its historic church was built in 1856, under the third pastor, and is listed on the National Register of Historic Places.

Early life and educations
Peter Durrett was born into slavery on the plantation of his white father, Captain Duerrett of Caroline County, Virginia. He would have learned a variety of skills from his mother and fellow slaves. While in Caroline County, at about age 25, he was converted to the gospel and began to be active as a Baptist exhorter. This was during the First Great Awakening, the revival of the late 18th century when Methodist and Baptist preachers in the South made many new converts.

Marriage and family
Peter married an enslaved woman who was held on another farm. When he learned in 1781 that her master was planning to migrate to Kentucky, he asked Captain Duerrett for help. Duerrett made an exchange so the couple could stay together, and Peter prepared to migrate.

Career
The Baptist preacher Joseph Craig held Peter and his wife as master. Craig, his family and slaves migrated in 1781 with the congregation and other members of The Travelling Church, led by Craig's older brother Rev. Lewis Craig from Spotsylvania, Virginia. Because Peter helped the military leader, Captain William Ellis, guide the several hundred migrants on the arduous 600-mile journey through the Appalachian Mountains, he became known as Old Captain among the travelers. He was believed to have learned the route at an earlier time, perhaps on an earlier journey with Ellis.

In Kentucky, Peter Durrett became a Baptist preacher, although he was never formally ordained. In 1784 he and his wife were members of their master Joseph Craig's church at the head of Boone's Creek. It was about eight miles east of the settlement of Lexington.

Soon after, when the church dissolved, Peter and his wife got permission from Craig to hire themselves out and moved to Lexington. They were hired most steadily by the pioneer John Maxwell, who also helped them build a cabin on his property at Maxwell Spring. Here Peter called fellow slaves together and began preaching. In the early years, they often met at different locations. The 19th-century religious historian and minister, Robert Hamilton Bishop, gives Mrs. Durrett credit for having been integral to forming the congregation: "His wife was also particularly active in providing accommodations for the people, and in encouraging them to be in earnest about the things which belonged to their everlasting peace.

Durrett applied to the local Baptist association for ordination, which they declined to do, but "directed him to go on in the name of their common Master." Gradually Durrett and his wife gathered about 50 congregants, most of whom Durrett baptized. As the congregation united as a church, Durrett began to administer the Lord's Supper.

By 1790, they had founded the First African Church of Lexington, now known as the First African Baptist Church. It was the first black congregation west of the Allegheny Mountains, the oldest black Baptist congregation in Kentucky, and the third oldest in the United States. Its early congregants were fellow slaves, who were joined by an increasing number of free blacks in the Lexington area. The congregation was believed to number up to 300 people during Durrett's lifetime. The trustees, all free men of color, purchased their first property for a worship place in 1815. Durrett lived until 1823, when he was said to be near 90.

He was succeeded by Rev. London Ferrill, also of mixed race. He was a free man of color whose free wife had purchased his freedom from slavery in Virginia. During his more than 30 years of service, Ferrill increased the congregation to 1,820 by 1850, making it the largest of any church, black or white, in the state. Although Durrett was never ordained, Ferrill was ordained by the First Baptist Church, a white congregation in Lexington. Leaders in that church were decided to accept the people Durrett had baptized without re-Baptism as members of Ferrill's congregation.

References

Year of birth uncertain
1730s births
1823 deaths
People from Caroline County, Virginia
African-American Baptist ministers
Baptist ministers from the United States
1790 in Christianity
18th-century American slaves
Baptists from Virginia
Virginia colonial people